Siccia adiaphora is a moth in the family Erebidae. It was described by Sergius G. Kiriakoff in 1958. It is found in Kenya and Uganda.

References

Moths described in 1958
Nudariina